A rhinolith is a stone present in the nasal cavity.  The word is derived from the roots rhino- and -lith, literally meaning "nose stone". It is an uncommon medical phenomenon, not to be confused with dried nasal mucus. A rhinolith usually forms around the nucleus of a small exogenous foreign body, blood clot or secretion by slow deposition of calcium and magnesium carbonate and phosphate salts. Over a period of time, they grow into large irregular masses that fill the nasal cavity. They may cause pressure necrosis of the nasal septum or lateral wall of nose. Rhinoliths can cause nasal obstruction, epistaxis, headache, sinusitis and epiphora. They can be diagnosed from the history with unilateral foul-smelling blood-stained nasal discharge or by anterior rhinoscopy. On probing, the probe can be passed around all its corners. In both CT and MRI a rhinolith will appear like a radiopaque irregular material. Small rhinoliths can be removed by a foreign body hook. Whereas large rhinoliths can be removed either by crushing with Luc's forceps or by Moore's lateral rhinotomy approach.

Signs and symptoms
Rhinoliths present as a unilateral nasal obstruction. Foul-smelling, blood-stained discharge is often present. Nosebleed and pain may occur due to the ulceration of surrounding mucosa.

Management
They are removed under general anaesthesia. Most can be removed through anterior nares. Large ones need to be broken into pieces before removal. Some particularly hard and irregular ones may require lateral rhinotomy.

References

External links 

Medical signs
Nose disorders